Sympistis exacta is a moth of the family Noctuidae first described by Hugo Theodor Christoph in 1887. It is found from the Near East to central Asia and Mongolia.

Adults are on wing from June to August. There is one generation per year.

References

External links

exacta
Moths of Asia
Moths described in 1887